This list is of Red Lists, Red Data Books, and related initiatives that assess and document the extinction risk of species, whether on an international or more local level (regional Red Lists). The IUCN has published a set of Guidelines for Application of the IUCN Red List Criteria at Regional and National Levels and at least 113 countries have produced their own Red Lists. Below, where a particular article or set of articles on a foreign-language Wikipedia provides fuller coverage, a link is provided.

International
 International Union for Conservation of Nature
IUCN Red List

 European Red List

Angola
: Lista Vermelha de Espécies de Angola, published by the Ministério do Ambiente

Armenia
: ԿԱՐՄԻՐ ԳԻՐՔ, published by the Ministry of Environment;

Australia
: Species Profile and Threats Database, published by the Department of Agriculture, Water and the Environment

Azerbaijan
:

Belarus
:

Brazil
: Livro Vermelho da Fauna Brasileira Ameaçada de Extinção, published by the Chico Mendes Institute for Biodiversity Conservation

Bulgaria
: Червена книга на Република България (Red Data Book of the Republic of Bulgaria), published by the Bulgarian Academy of Sciences and Ministry of Environment and Water;

Canada
: Species at risk public registry, published by the Government of Canada

China
: 中国生物多样性红色名录, published by the Ministry of Ecology and Environment: 脊椎动物卷 (vertebrates) 高等植物卷 (higher plants); 中国生物多样性红色名录 脊椎动物 第一卷 哺乳动物 (Mammals); cf.

Colombia
: Libros Rojos, published by the Ministry of Environment and Sustainable Development

Czech Republic

Denmark
: Den danske Rødliste, published by Aarhus University;

Finland
: Suomen lajien uhanalaisuus – Punainen kirja, jointly published by the Ministry of the Environment; Web Service of the Red List of Finnish Species, published on the

France

Germany
:

Greece
: Το Κόκκινο Βιβλίο των Απειλούμενων Ζώων της Ελλάδας, published by the Hellenic Zoological Society;

Iceland

Italy 
: Liste Rosse Nazionali, published by the Ministry of the Ecological Transition

Japan
: Ministry of the Environment Red List

Kazakhstan
:

Kyrgyzstan
: Кыргыз Республикасынын Кызыл китеби;

Latvia
:

Lithuania
:

Moldova
: Cartea roșie a Republicii Moldova, published by the Academy of Sciences of Moldova and Ministry of Environment;

Netherlands
:

New Zealand
: New Zealand Threat Classification System, published by the Department of Conservation

Nicaragua
: Lista Roja, Especies en Alto Riesgo

Norway
: Norsk rødliste for arter, published by Artsdatabanken;

Philippines
: National List of Threatened Fauna, maintained by the Department of Environment and Natural Resources

Poland
: Polska Czerwona Księga Zwierząt; Polska Czerwona Księga Roślin;

Russia
: Red Data Book of the Russian Federation; also by Federal subject — Sakhalin Oblast: Красная Книга Сахалинской области: Животные / Растения и грибы; Category:Красные книги по субъектам Российской Федерации

South Korea

Spain
: Libro rojo de los vertebrados de España, Atlas y libro rojo de la flora vascular amenazada de España, published by the Ministry of Environment

Sri Lanka
: The National Red List 2012 of Sri Lanka, published by the Ministry of Environment

Sweden
: Rödlistade arter i Sverige, published by the Swedish University of Agricultural Sciences (SLU Artdatabanken)

Switzerland
: Rote Listen: Gefährdete Arten der Schweiz, published by the Federal Office for the Environment; cf.

Taiwan

Tajikistan
:

Turkmenistan
: Türkmenistanyň Gyzyl Kitaby, published by the Ministry of Nature Protection;

Ukraine
: Red Data Book of Ukraine

United Kingdom
: Conservation designations for UK taxa, published by the JNCC

United States of America
: Federal Lists of Endangered and Threatened Wildlife and Plants, published by the United States Fish and Wildlife Service

Uzbekistan
: O'zbekiston Respublikasining Qizil kitobi;

Vietnam
: Vietnam's Red Data Book

See also
 List of heritage registers

References

External links
 IUCN Regional Guidelines
 National Red List database

Red Lists